U.S. Highway 45 (US 45) runs north–south through the eastern and northern portions of the state of Wisconsin.

Route description

US 45 enters from Illinois at Pikeville and is a two-lane road up to its junction with WIS 36 southwest of Milwaukee.  It runs concurrent with WIS 36 to its junction with WIS 100.  As it follows WIS 100 north, it becomes an urban multilane road.  It merges onto I-43 north in Greenfield then follows I-894, I-41, and US 41 north from the Hale Interchange one mile (1.6 km) to the east. After I-894 ends at I-94, US 45 continues as a freeway north into Wauwatosa following I-41 and US 41 north of the Zoo Interchange.  The two routes split further north with US 45 continuing to West Bend.  The freeway section of US 45 ends north of West Bend and continues into Kewaskum as a four-lane highway.  North of Kewaskum, it passes through Waucousta and Eden as it approaches Fond du Lac

US 45 reaches a point just south of  Fond du Lac, where it joins US 151 and, in  a brief wrong-way concurrency, jogs to the west, where it joins I-41.  It then follows I-41 north around Fond du Lac to the junction with WIS 23, and jogs back east, into the center of Fond du Lac, where it then turns north, and follows the shore of Lake Winnebago as a two-lane road, to Oshkosh.  It runs through Oshkosh as Main Street, then turns onto Algoma Boulevard, which it follows out of Oshkosh.  As it crosses I-41 it becomes a freeway facility to US 10 in Winchester. After briefly joining US 10, US 45 takes a northward track as a two-lane rural road and heads into North Central Wisconsin with the exception of a four-lane expressway between Clintonville and Marion.  The route serves as the central street for Antigo and Eagle River and passes into various state and national forest land. The route leaves the state at Land O' Lakes.

Major intersections

See also

References

External links

US 45 at Wisconsin Highways

 Wisconsin
45
Freeways in the Milwaukee area
Transportation in Kenosha County, Wisconsin
Transportation in Racine County, Wisconsin
Transportation in Waukesha County, Wisconsin
Transportation in Milwaukee County, Wisconsin
Transportation in Washington County, Wisconsin
Transportation in Fond du Lac County, Wisconsin
Transportation in Winnebago County, Wisconsin
Transportation in Waupaca County, Wisconsin
Transportation in Outagamie County, Wisconsin
Transportation in Shawano County, Wisconsin
Transportation in Langlade County, Wisconsin
Transportation in Oneida County, Wisconsin
Transportation in Vilas County, Wisconsin